David Allen (born December 28, 1945) is an American productivity consultant best known for the creation of a time management method called "Getting Things Done".

Careers 
Allen grew up in Shreveport, Louisiana where he acted and won a state championship in debate. He went to college at New College, now New College of Florida, in Sarasota, Florida, and completed graduate work in American history at University of California, Berkeley. 

After graduate school, Allen began using heroin and was briefly institutionalized. His career path has included jobs as a magician, waiter, karate teacher, landscaper, vitamin distributor, glass-blowing lathe operator, travel agent, gas station manager, U-Haul dealer, moped salesman, restaurant cook, personal growth trainer, manager of a lawn service company, and manager of a travel agency. He is an ordained minister with the Movement of Spiritual Inner Awareness. He claims to have had 35 professions before age 35. He began applying his perspective on productivity with businesses in the 1980s when he was awarded a contract to design a program for executives and managers at Lockheed.

Companies founded 
He is the founder of the David Allen Company, an executive coaching firm using his "Getting Things Done" methodology. David Allen Company presenters, not Allen, regularly give one-day public seminars on the methodology, and Allen himself occasionally gives lectures or sessions. Allen has also licensed GTD to Crucial Learning, a learning company that offers a Getting Things Done course in a variety of formats. 

Allen  was also one of the founders of Actioneer, a company specializing in productivity tools for the PalmPilot.

Publications and habitat 
Allen has written three books: Getting Things Done: The Art of Stress-Free Productivity, which describes his productivity program; Ready for Anything: 52 Productivity Principles for Work and Life, a collection of newsletter articles he has written; Making It All Work: Winning at the Game of Work and Business of Life, a follow-up to his first book. In 2015 he also wrote a new updated version of Getting Things Done: the Art of Stress-Free Productivity. 

Allen lived in Ojai, California with his fourth wife, Kathryn. In 2014, they moved to Amsterdam in the Netherlands.

Bibliography

References

Further reading
 Beardsley, David. (April 1998) "Don't Manage Time, Manage Yourself." Fast Company. Issue 14, p. 64.
 Fallows, James. (July/August 2004) "Organize Your Life!." Atlantic Monthly. Vol. 294, No. 1, pp. 171–2.
 Wolf, Gary. September 25, 2007 Getting Things Done Guru David Allen and His Cult of Hyperefficiency Wired : 15.10

External links 

 The David Allen Company website
 Crucial Learning's Getting Things Done course

1945 births
Living people
American male bloggers
American bloggers
American business writers
American self-help writers
Place of birth missing (living people)
New College of Florida alumni
UC Berkeley College of Letters and Science alumni
Writers from Shreveport, Louisiana
21st-century American non-fiction writers